Eumops delticus is a species of free-tailed bat found in South America.

Taxonomy
Eumops delticus was described as a new species in 1923 by British mammalogist Oldfield Thomas.
The holotype had been collected by Wilhelm Ehrhardt (1860–1936), a Guyana-born German animal collector.
The type locality was the Brazilian island of Marajó.
In 1932, Colin Campbell Sanborn published that E. delticus should be considered a subspecies of the dwarf bonneted bat (E. bonariensis).
It was generally regarded as a subspecies until 2008 when Eger et al. published it as its own species again.

Description

Range and habitat
E. delticus is found in the following South American countries: Brazil, Colombia, and Peru.

Conservation
As of 2018, it is evaluated as a data deficient species by the IUCN.
It meets the criteria for this classification because of ongoing uncertainty of its geographic range and ecological requirements.

References

Mammals described in 1923
Bats of South America
Taxa named by Oldfield Thomas
Eumops